Hesperotettix viridis, known generally as the snakeweed grasshopper or meadow purple-striped grasshopper, is a species of spur-throated grasshopper in the family Acrididae. It is found in North America.

Subspecies
 Hesperotettix viridis brevipennis (Thomas, 1874)
 Hesperotettix viridis nevadensis  (short-winged snakeweed grasshopper)
 Hesperotettix viridis pratensis Scudder, 1897 (purple-striped grasshopper)
 Hesperotettix viridis viridis (Thomas, 1872) (snakeweed grasshopper)

References

Further reading

 
 

Melanoplinae